Andreas Pavias ( 1440-1504/1512) was a Greek painter and educator. He was one of the founding fathers of the Cretan School, and his works influenced countless artists both Italian and Greek; paintings by Pavias could be found in many churches and private collections in both geographic areas. Seven of these paintings survive today, six bearing the artist's signature. The most famous of the group is a Crucifixion.

Pavias learned his craft from Angelos Akotantos, and was affiliated with Andreas Ritzos. He experimented with different techniques, and his paintings incorporate stylistic traits from the   
Venetian school. Angelos Pitzamanos was the student of Pavias, who also influenced the works of such Cretan School artists as Theodore Poulakis, Georgios Klontzas, and Michael Damaskenos.

Early life 

Pavias was born in  Heraklion.  His father's name was Petros.  He was a priest.  Pavia's wife's name was Maria or Marietta.  He had a son named Athanasios he was a painter. Andreas also had an adoptive daughter named Agnes.  Pavias studied painting under Angelos Akotantos.  He was also recorded loaning money to painter Andreas Ritzos. Archival documents in Venice demonstrate that Pavias was involved in business deals in Heraklion in the years 1471, 1473, and 1479.  On April 23, 1480 he was a witness and he signed the document magister Andreas Pavias, penctor.  In 1481 he rented a house on Georgio Grin in Vourgo Candia Palaiochora.             

[[File:Scuola di andrea ritzos o andrea pavias, trittico con pietà e scene di passione e resurrezione, creta 1510 ca.jpg|thumb|250px|right|'Triptych Scenes of the Passion, Resurrection, and Crucifixion']]
He was an art teacher he primarily taught icon painting.  Records indicate in 1482 Angelo Pitzamanos's father signed a contract with Pavias to teach his son painting for five years.  Pavias was considerably wealthy.  Another document shows him purchasing selling and renting houses in Heraklion during the years 1482, 1483, 1486, and 1491.  On October 24, 1492, he signed a five-year contract with Manousos Koukou to teach his son painting for five years.         

Catholic Bishop Giovanni Battista Lagni commissioned a painting called Pieta (Lamentation of Christ) from Pavias between 1493-1505.  The painting is currently in Rossano.     On May 23, 1499, he signed a contract to teach Niccolo da Napoli painting for three years.  Around the same period, he agreed to teach John Ploraio painting.  On November 19, 1499, he signed a contract to teach a Jew named Aquilo Souloum.  He agreed to teach her son painting, reading and writing for eight years.  Around the same period, Pavias made out a will leaving his adoptive daughter Agnes a huge fortune.  He gave her 500 iperpira, 10 gold doukata.  Enough money to purchase a house in Chandaka (Heraklion) at that time.  He also gave her gold, silver, gems, clothing, and jewelry.          

On May 7, 1500, in a document, he requested his painting Nativity'' by famous painter Angelo to be returned.  Pavias was involved with famous painter Marko Amarando.  In 1504, he purchased a warehouse in Heraklion.  The painter died by  November 8, 1512, because a document refers to his wife as the widow Marietta.  In 1514, she was the administrator of the estate, and she gave away part of the monastery of the Agios Pnevmatos (Holy Spirit).  It was just outside of Vourgos Palaiochora.

Notable works
Agios Antonios, located (Korgialenio History and Folklore Museum)
Kimisis of Ephrem the Syrian, located (Saint Constantine Church of the Holy Sepulchre  
Pieta, located Rossano Cathedral Italy
Crucifixion,  located National Gallery Athens  
XC, located Campo Santo Teutonico, Vatican City 
ΘΚ, located (Calligaris, Terzo d'Aquileia, Italy)

See also 
 The Crucifixion
Maniera greca
Ioannis Permeniates
Konstantinos Paleokapas
Georgios Nomikos

External links 
 National Gallery of Greece
 Institute of Modern Greek Research: Pavia Andreas

References

Bibliography

Cretan Renaissance painters
Greek icon painters
1440 births
16th-century deaths
15th-century Greek painters
16th-century Greek painters
Artists from Heraklion